The IBM System/370 Model 155 (and the Model 165),
were jointly announced Jun 30, 1970 as "designed for ... the Seventies." That same day IBM announced the 370/195.  They were the first three models of the IBM System/370 line of computers.

Three months later a fourth IBM System/370, the Model 145, was announced. Since none of them came with virtual memory, "which was to be a hallmark of the 370 line" some said about these early members of the IBM System/370 family, especially about the 165 & 155, that they were not "the real 370 line."

Limitations
Some said about these early members of the IBM System/370 family, looking back, that they were not "the real 370 line" because
"neither offered virtual storage capability, which was to be a hallmark of the 370 line."

The 370/155 was described as able to "run under DOS." Both the 155 and the larger 370/165 could "run under OS/360." Being members of the System/370 family, the Model 155 and Model 165 were compatible with each other. Neither machine, as announced, could run a virtual memory operating system.

Growth path
The initially announced systems were in many ways merely improved IBM 360 systems.  Both were announced as 
running 360 Operating Systems.  No mention was made of virtual memory
or new operating systems.

The IBM System/370's basic architecture was described as having been "extended, but not redesigned" from that of IBM System/360.

Upgrade option
In 1972 an upgrade option was announced "to provide the hardware necessary to operate in a virtual memory mode."

Unlike the IBM System/370 Model 145, which as early as June 1971 could have virtual memory capability added to it with a simple microcode update from a floppy disk, the Model 155 and Model 165 needed expensive hardware additions—$200,000 for the 155 and $400,000 for the 165—to add virtual memory capability, and even this had to wait until 1972, at which time their upgraded 155 was known as an IBM System/370 Model 155-II.

Physical memory
Although the joint 155/165 announcement did not have the word virtual, there were multiple references to (physical) memory, storage (both main memory and disk storage), and cache memory under the name "buffer".

The 155 had seven main memory choices, ranging from 256K to 2 MB; the 165: five possibilities, from 512K to 3 MB. Both models were described as having "a very high-performance buffer storage backed by a large" main memory.

Channels
Two byte multiplexer channels could be installed on a 155.

See also
 List of IBM products
 IBM System/360
 IBM System/370

Notes

References

IBM System/360 mainframe line
Computer-related introductions in 1970